Georgi Gospodinov (born January 7, 1968) is a Bulgarian writer, poet and playwright. One of the most translated Bulgarian authors after 1989, he has four poetry books awarded with national literary prizes. First of them, Lapidarium (1992), won the National Debut Prize. Volumes of his selected poetry came out in German, Portuguese, Czech and Macedonian.

Literary career
Gospodinov became internationally known by his Natural novel, which was published in 21 languages, including English (Dalkey Archive Press, 2005), German, French, Spanish, Italian, etc. The New Yorker described it as an “anarchic, experimental debut”, according to The Guardian, it is “both earthy and intellectual”, Le Courrier (Geneve) calls it “a machine for stories.”

And Other Stories (2001), collection of short stories, came out in German, French, English, Italian and was longlisted for Frank O'Connor Award. This is the book that contains the story "Blind Vaysha", on which is based the short animation film of the same name (dir. Theodore Ushev, NFB and ARTE), an OSCAR nominee for 2017. 
Gospodinov has also written two plays, screenplays for short feature films, among which is Omelette  (4.44’; Honorable Mention at the Sundance Film Festival 2009) He is co-author of an art graphic novel, The Eternal Fly (2010, with the artist N. Toromanov).

His second novel, The Physics of Sorrow (2012), won three national awards for best fiction 2012-2013, among which the National Award for Best Novel of the Year 2013. Physics of Sorrow is published in Italian, German, Serbian, Romanian, and in English in the US by Open Letter Books. Frankfurter Allgemeine Zeitung praised the novel as “a gorgeous work that should definitely be read”. According to Neue Zurcher Zeitung “with Physics of Sorrow Gospodinov launches not only the Bulgarian literature but also himself in the European writers’ first league.” 
In 2014, the Italian edition of the novel, Fisica della malinconia, Voland Edizioni], was shortlisted for Strega European Prize and Premio Gregor von Rezzori; the German edition, Physik der Schwermut, Droschl Verlag, was a finalist for Internationaler Literaturpreis - Haus der Kulturen der Welt and Brücke Berlin Literatur- und Übersetzerpreis.

International and national awards for The Physics of Sorrow
 Strega European Prize, Rome, 2021, winner;
 Angelus Award, Poland, 2019, winner;
 Jan Michalski Prize for Literature, Switzerland, 2016, winner; 
 Prozart Award, Skopje, for contribution to the development of literature in the Balkans, 2016, winner; 
 The American PEN Translation Prize, 2016, finalist; 
 The Best Translated Book Award (BTBA), 2016, finalist; 
 Strega European Prize, Rome, 2014, finalist; 
 Premio Gregor von Rezzori, Florence, 2014, finalist; 
 Bruecke Berlin Preis, 2014, finalist;
 Haus der Kulturen der Welt Literaturpreis, Berlin, 2014, finalist; 
 National Literary Award Bulgarian Novel of the Year, 2013, winner;
 National Award Hristo G. Danov for Best Fiction, 2012, winner; 
 The City of Sofia Award for Literature, 2012, winner; 
 The Flower of Helicon Readers’ Prize for Bestselling Book, 2012, winner.

Bibliography
Natural Novel, 1999 (English translation by Zornitza Hristova and Dalkey Archive Press, 2005)
And Other Stories, 2001 (Bulgarian: И други истории, English translation by  Alexis Levitin, Magdalena Levy and Northwestern University Press, 2007)
The Physics of Sorrow, 2012 (Bulgarian: Физика на тъгата, English translation by Angela Rodel and Open Letter, 2015)
Time Shelter, 2020 (Bulgarian: Времеубежище, will be published in the United States by Norton and in France by Gallimard by the end of 2021)

Film 
The 2016 animated short Blind Vaysha by Bulgarian-Canadian filmmaker Theodore Ushev is based on a Gospodinov short story. On January 24, 2017, the Academy of Motion Picture Arts and Science announced that Blind Vaysha has been nominated for Best Animated Short at the 89th Academy Awards. In 2019, Ushev released another animated short film adaptation of Gospodinov's work, The Physics of Sorrow.

References

External links
 Natural Novel at Complete review
 Gospodinov at his Bulgarian publisher's web page
 Gospodinov at his American publisher's web page
 Gospodinov at the Contemporary Bulgarian Writers website

1968 births
Living people
Writers from Sofia
People from Yambol